Mohammad Irfan, Jr. (15 May 1995) is a former Pakistani first-class cricketer who played for Water and Power Development Authority and had represented Lahore Qalandars, Karachi Kings and Quetta Gladiators in the PSL. 

In April 2018, he was named in Khyber Pakhtunkhwa's squad for the 2018 Pakistan Cup.

He currently lives in Sydney, Australia where he plays for Western Suburbs as he awaits Australian citizenship.

References

External links
 

Living people
1995 births
Pakistani cricketers
Lahore Qalandars cricketers
Karachi Kings cricketers
Quetta Gladiators cricketers
Water and Power Development Authority cricketers
Punjabi people
People from Nankana Sahib District
Southern Punjab (Pakistan) cricketers